Chaplain (Major General) Luther Deck Miller, USA (June 14, 1890 – April 27, 1972) was an American Army officer who served as the 6th Chief of Chaplains of the United States Army from 1945 to 1949.

References

External links
Generals of World War II

1890 births
1972 deaths
People from Armstrong County, Pennsylvania
United States Army generals of World War II
United States Army generals
Chiefs of Chaplains of the United States Army
Burials at Arlington National Cemetery
Recipients of the Distinguished Service Medal (US Army)
World War II chaplains
20th-century American clergy
United States Army personnel of World War I
Military personnel from Pennsylvania